Felix Thomas Tollemache (16 Feb 1796 – 5 October 1843) was a British gentleman and Tory politician. He was the second son of William Tollemache, Lord Huntingtower and Catherine Gray.

On 1 October 1825, he married Sarah Gray (1805-1831), by whom he had three children:
William James Felix Tollemache (12 January 1827 – 3 November 1859)
Caroline Tollemache (7 June 1828 – 6 June 1867), married on 15 February 1853, her first cousin, Rev. Ralph Tollemache
Granville Gray Tollemache (b. 21 September 1830), died young

At the 1826 general election, he stood in Ilchester, along with his older brother Lionel. Neither brother was elected. However, the result was overturned on a petition in 1827.  The brothers served as Members of Parliament (MPs) for Ilchester until they were defeated in the 1830 general election.

On 27 April 1833, he married again, to Frances Julia Peters, but had no children by her.

References

Sources
Descendants of Sir Robert de Manners, of Etal

External links 

1796 births
1843 deaths
Tory MPs (pre-1834)
Members of the Parliament of the United Kingdom for English constituencies
UK MPs 1826–1830
Younger sons of baronets
Younger sons of barons
Felix Thomas Tollemache